Muir Middle School / John Muir Middle School, a common name for a number of schools

Muir Middle School may refer to:
 Muir Middle School (Milford, Michigan), school in Huron Valley School District

John Muir Middle School may refer to any of the following schools in the United States:
 John Muir Middle School (Burbank, California)
 John Muir Middle School (Corcoran, California), school in Corcoran, California
 John Muir Middle School (Los Angeles), school in LA's Promise system of schools (formerly known as MLA Partner Schools)
 John Muir Middle School (San Jose, California), school in San Jose Unified School District
 John Muir Middle School (San Leandro, California), school in San Leandro Unified School District
 John Muir Middle School (Milwaukee, Wisconsin), part of the Milwaukee Public Schools
 John Muir Middle School (Wausau, Wisconsin), part of the Wausau School District